Glyphis may refer to:

 Glyphis (lichen), a genus of lichens in the family Graphidaceae
 Glyphis (shark), a genus of river sharks from Southeast Asia and Australia